The Ministry of Communications and Information (MCI; ;) is a ministry of the Government of Singapore responsible
for overseeing the development of the infocomm technology, cyber security, media sectors, as well as the government’s information and public communication policies. It is also responsible for maintaining the national library, national archives and public libraries.

History

On 5 June 1959, the Ministry of Culture came into being with the swearing-in and appointments of ministers of the new Government of Singapore. On 1 February 1980, the Broadcasting Division of the Ministry of Culture became a statutory board, the Singapore Broadcasting Corporation.

1985 saw the dissolution of the Ministry of Culture. Its Information Division came under the new Ministry of Communications and Information (MCI). Its arts promotion component was assimilated into the Ministry of Community Development (MCD) as the Cultural Affairs Division.

Five years later, on 28 November 1990, the Information Division of the MCI and the Cultural Affairs Division of MCD, together with other associated departments and statutory boards, reunited to form the Ministry of Information and the Arts (MITA).

On 1 September 1991, the Festival of Arts Secretariat, Singapore Cultural Foundation, the Arts Division of MITA, and the National Theatre Trust merged to form the National Arts Council (NAC).

On 1 October 1994, the Singapore Broadcasting Authority (SBA) was formed as a statutory board under MITA to oversee and promote the broadcasting industry in Singapore.

On 23 November 2001, the information and communications technology (ICT) functions under the Ministry of Communications and Information Technology came under MITA. The expanded Ministry was renamed the Ministry of Information, Communications and the Arts, but retained the acronym MITA. In that year, Infocomm Development Authority (IDA) became one of MITA's statutory boards.

On 1 January 2003, the Singapore Broadcasting Authority, Singapore Films Commission and Films and Publications Department (previously under the MITA headquarters) merged to form the Media Development Authority (MDA). On 13 August 2004, the Ministry's acronym was changed from "MITA" to "MICA".

On 1 November 2012, MICA was renamed the Ministry of Communications and Information (MCI). The move followed the restructuring of two previous ministries – MICA and the Ministry of Community Development, Youth and Sports (MCYS) – into MCI, the Ministry of Culture, Community and Youth (MCCY) and the Ministry of Social and Family Development (MSF). REACH (Reaching Everyone for Active Citizenry @ Home) was assimilated into MCI while the resilience, arts and heritage portfolios became part of MCCY. MCI now oversees the development of the information and communications technology, media and design sectors, public libraries, and the Government’s information and public communication policies.

On 18 January 2016, MCI announced that the Infocomm Development Authority of Singapore (IDA) and the Media Development Authority (MDA) will be restructured into two new entities: The Info-communications Media Development Authority (IMDA) and the Government Technology Organisation (GTO) (now Government Technology Agency; GovTech), in the second half of 2016. The new statutory boards were formed on 1 October 2016.

Organisational structure
MCI has two statutory boards, the Infocomm Media Development Authority (IMDA) and the National Library Board (NLB).

MCI also manages the Cyber Security Agency, a national agency overseeing cybersecurity strategy, operations, education, outreach, and ecosystem development and the Personal Data Protection Commission, Singapore's primary data protection authority.

Ministers
The Ministry is headed by the Minister for Communications and Information, who is appointed as part of the Cabinet of Singapore. The incumbent minister is Josephine Teo from the People's Action Party.

References

External links
Official website of the Ministry of Communications and Information

2012 establishments in Singapore
Singapore
Singapore
Ministries established in 2012
Communications